Mir Amir Rind is a Pakistani politician who was a Member of the Provincial Assembly of Balochistan, from May 2013 to May 2018.

Education
He has a degree in Bachelor of Arts.

Political career

He was elected to the Provincial Assembly of Balochistan as an independent candidate from Constituency PB-31 Bolan-II in 2013 Pakistani general election. He received 26,775 votes and defeated an independent candidate, Mir Ghulam Mujtaba Murad Abro.

References

Living people
Balochistan MPAs 2013–2018
Pakistan Muslim League (N) politicians
Year of birth missing (living people)